Telmatobius atacamensis is a species of frog in the family Telmatobiidae.
It is endemic to Argentina.
Its natural habitats are rivers and swampland.
It is threatened by habitat loss.

References

atacamensis
Endemic fauna of Argentina
Amphibians of Argentina
Amphibians of the Andes
Amphibians described in 1962
Taxonomy articles created by Polbot